= Via Czechia =

Long-distance trails in the Czech Republic

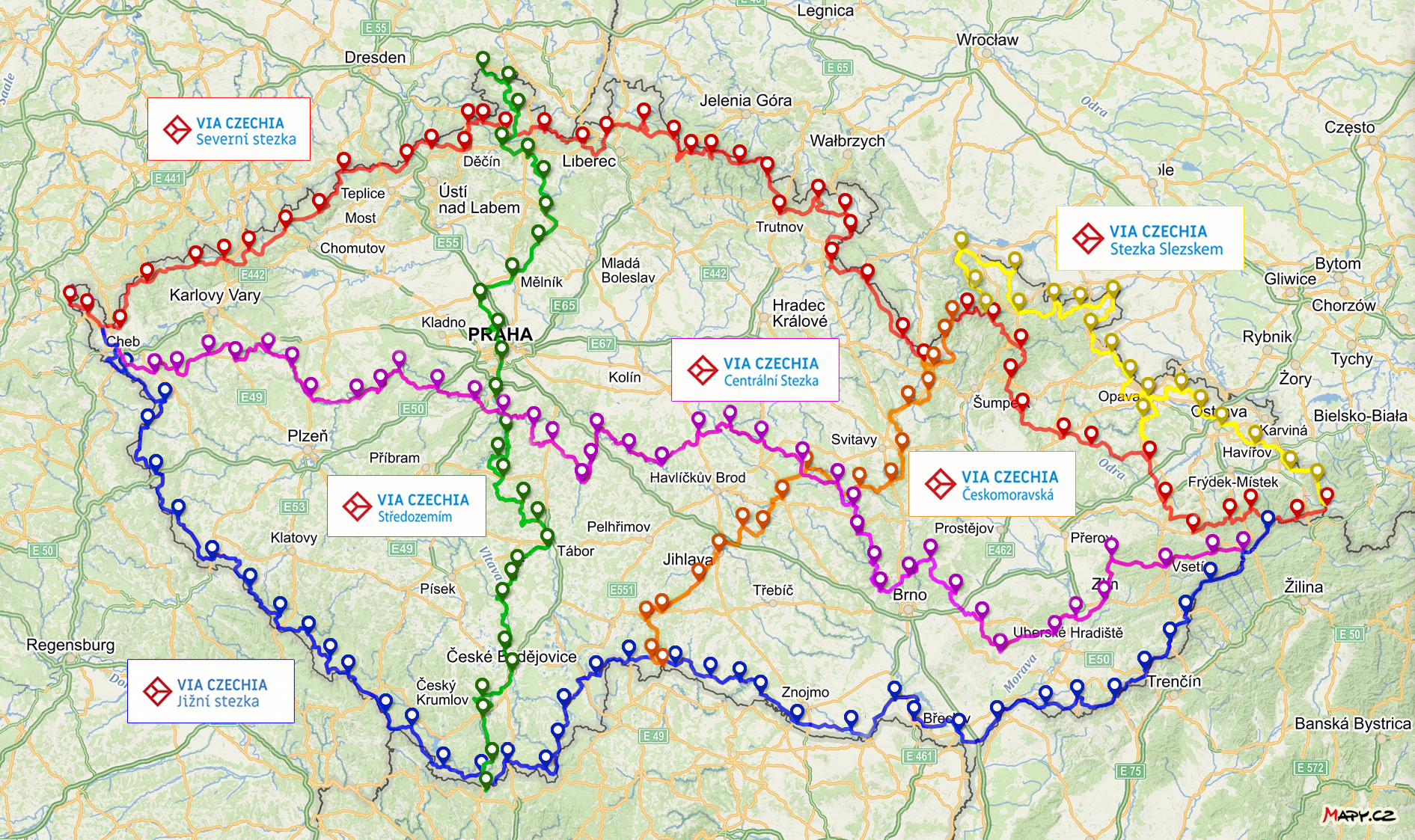
Map of all six trails of Via Czechia

Via Czechia consists of six marked long-distance trails that are located in the Czech Republic (also called Czechia, therefore the name). In total, the length of these trails is over 10,000 kilometres (6,200 mi). Web Via Czechia The author of the project is Jan Hocek.

== Severní stezka (North trail) ==
Severní stezka (North trail) is the longest trail of Via Czechia (and also the longest trail in whole Czech Republic). It leads from the western part of the country to the east as it connects the westernmost and easternmost points of the country. The trail goes over northern border mountains and the length of the walking version is 1,058 km (657 mi).

== Jižní stezka (South trail) ==
Jižní stezka (South trail) is the second-longest trail of Via Czechia. It goes from the western part of the country to the east as it connects its westernmost and easternmost points. The trail leads over southern regions of the country. The walking version is 1,052 km (654 mi) long.

== Centrální stezka (Central trail) ==
Centrální stezka (Central trail) is 1,036 km (644 mi) long (walking version) and connects the most western and most eastern parts of the Czech Republic and leads over its central part.

== Stezka středozemím (Midland trail) ==
Stezka středozemím (Midland trail) connects the northernmost and the most southernmost parts of the Czech Republic. The length of the walking version is 569 km (354 mi).

== Stezka Slezskem (Silesian trail) ==
Stezka Slezskem (Silesian trail) is the second shortest trail of Via Czechia with a length or the walking version of 382 km (237 mi). It goes over border mountains in Czech Silesia.

== Českomoravská stezka (Bohemian-Moravian trail) ==
Českomoravská stezka (Bohemian-Moravian trail) goes upon a border between the historical regions of Bohemia and Moravia. It is the shortest trail of Via Czechia with a length of walking variant of 345 km (214 mi).
